Wanderlust is a British television drama miniseries written by Nick Payne and directed by Luke Snellin and Lucy Tcherniak. The series is a co-production between BBC One and Netflix, with BBC One airing the first episode on 4 September 2018 in the United Kingdom, and Netflix streaming the show outside the UK. It began airing on 19 October 2018 on Netflix. The miniseries consists of six episodes.

Plot
Joy Richards, a therapist, is injured in a traffic accident. The accident was caused in part by distraction upon her sighting a former patient of hers, Emily. Emily's husband, Josh (who was also a patient in couples therapy), committed suicide during the treatment. Joy's injuries and her recovery from them exacerbate the marital difficulties she is having with her husband, Alan. Joy meets Marvin at physical therapy, and they have a fling. Alan confesses an affair with a colleague, Claire. Rather than become mutually acrimonious, Joy suggests an open marriage as a solution to their difficulties. Joy's affair with Marvin ends but she rekindles romance with her (now married) former boyfriend Lawrence. Alan detests Lawrence because Joy had cheated on Alan previously with Lawrence. Episode 5 consists mainly of a long session with Joy's own therapist (Angela), during which Joy comes to realize her self-destructive promiscuity is a sublimation to avoid the real issues in her life: bereavement from her mother's death and guilt over the suicide of her patient, Josh.

Cast 
 Toni Collette as Joy Richards, a therapist, married to Alan.
 Steven Mackintosh as Alan Richards, an English teacher and Joy's husband.
 Zawe Ashton as Claire Pascal, a fellow English teacher at Alan's school.
 Joe Hurst as Tom Richards, a 16-year-old student and youngest child of Joy and Alan.
 Emma D'Arcy as Naomi Richards, Alan and Joy's 18-year-old daughter.
 Celeste Dring as Laura Richards, Joy and Alan's 25-year-old daughter.
 Royce Pierreson as Jason Hales, a patient of Joy's.
 William Ash as Marvin Walters, a police officer who begins a sexual relationship with Joy.
 Isis Hainsworth as Michelle McCullen, a friend of Tom who is in love with him.
 Jeremy Swift as Neil Bellows, Rita's husband and a neighbour of Joy's.
 Anastasia Hille as Rita Bellows, Joy's neighbour. After her marriage to Neil breaks down, she begins to explore her sexuality with Naomi.
 Sophie Okonedo as Angela Bowden, Joy's therapist.
 Paul Kaye as Lawrence, a former husband of Joy for whom she still has some affection.
 Dylan Edwards as Marc, a young man who Joy dates occasionally.
 Anya Chalotra as Jennifer Ashman, an older pupil at Tom's school.
 Kate O'Flynn as Emily Riley, a former patient of Joy who attended couples therapy with her husband Josh.
 Simon Tcherniak as Josh Riley, Emily's husband who also attended couples therapy and called Joy before committing suicide.
 Megan Richards as Mimi Brooks, a friend of Tom and Michelle.
 Jordan Adene as Sam Morton, also a friend of Tom and Michelle.
 Ashley McGuire as Janet Malherbe

Reviews 
The series was described by the Evening Standard as a "meandering polyamory drama".

Episodes

Soundtrack
Recurring: Regulate by Warren G and Nate Dogg
Episode 5: The Ship Song, written by Nick Cave and performed by Nick Cave and the Bad Seeds
Episode 6: Song to the Siren performed by This Mortal Coil featuring Elizabeth Fraser and Robin Guthrie. Sour Soul by BadBadNotGood.

References

External links
 

2018 British television series debuts
2018 British television series endings
2010s British drama television series
2010s British television miniseries
BBC television dramas
English-language Netflix original programming
Television series about marriage